OTF is a three-character combination that may refer to:

Sports
 Obstructing the field, an infringement in cricket

Technology
 An abbreviation of the words "On The Fly" to refer to procedural generation, a method of creating data algorithmically as opposed to manually
 OTF knife (out-of-the-front knife), a pocketknife with a blade that opens and closes through a hole in one end of the handle
 OpenType (Font), a standard for digital typography, which uses font files with the file extension .otf
 Output Text Format, the SAP R/3 data format
 Optical transfer function
 "Off-The-Film", a camera metering system in which the reading is taken directly at (or from) the focal plane. See also Through-the-lens metering

Music
 Only the Family (commonly abbreviated OTF), a hip-hop music collective founded by American rapper Lil Durk and based in Chicago, Illinois
 OTF, a record label of Only the Family collective

Chemistry
 The functional group, trifluoromethanesulfonate or simply triflate, represented by the symbol -OTf

Organizations
 Ontario Teachers' Federation
 Open Technology Fund, a U.S. Government funded program that was created in 2012

Other
 Some companies also use OTF as an abbreviation for 'Order To Fix'